Mohammad Muqim (born 15 January 1953) is an Indian politician for the Domariaganj (Lok Sabha constituency) in Uttar Pradesh.

External links
 Official biographical sketch in Parliament of India website

1953 births
Living people
People from Siddharthnagar
India MPs 2004–2009
Bahujan Samaj Party politicians from Uttar Pradesh
Lok Sabha members from Uttar Pradesh